Lions of Medina is a book written by historian Doyle Glass, first published by Coleche Press on May 1, 2007 and subsequently by NAL Caliber (Penguin) on July 1, 2008. The book is a first hand account of the Marines and Navy Corpsmen of Charlie Company, 1st Marines, 1st Marine Division during the Vietnam War  culminating in Operation Medina in October 1967.

Based on extensive interviews with survivors of Operation Medina, as well as with the friends and families of the men who didn't make it back, Lions of Medina takes readers through the training, the hardships, the tragedies, and the triumphs of war, and into the heart of a close-knit group of warriors who fought, bled, and died together, and shared a spirit of loyalty and camaraderie that binds them together to this day.

Operation Medina
Operation Medina was a search and destroy operation conducted in the Hai Lang Forest Reserve of South Vietnam in the fall of 1967 during the Vietnam War. Conducted by the First and Second battalions of the First Marine Regiment, the First Battalion of the Third Marine Regiment, and two battalions of the First ARVN Division, the objective of the operation was to locate and annihilate any North Vietnamese (NVA) forces found in the forest reserve.

One specific enemy base that the Marines sought to eliminate was known as Base Area 101. Base Area 101 was an NVA staging area, a place where the NVA felt safe enough to build up personnel and supplies. The base was a launching point for attacks by the Fifth and Sixth NVA Regiments against the possible Marine bases at Con Thien, Khe Sahn, Dong Ha and Phu Bai.

Operation Medina began on 10 October 1967 and ended on 20 October. The operation obtained partial success. Even though the NVA were not driven out of the Hai Lang Forest Reserve, significant losses were inflicted upon them by the Marine and ARVN forces.

Critical Acclaim
"Doyle Glass has written a stirring tribute to the valor of Marines in Vietnam. Lions of Medina captures the chaos and ferocity of infantry combat, and shows that little has changed from the pass at Thermopylae, to the jungles of Vietnam and the streets of Iraq.” -Nathaniel Fick, New York Times best selling author of One Bullet Away

“In this moving story of Americans in combat, Doyle Glass takes us deep into the harrowing experiences of one Marine unit in one of the Vietnam War’s most bitter battles. What Stephen Ambrose did for Easy Company, 506th Parachute Infantry, in Band of Brothers, Glass does  for Charlie Company, 1st Marines, in this  excellent, powerful book.” -John C. McManus, author of Alamo in the Ardennes and The Deadly Brotherhood

“A gritty and gutsy account of what it is like to fight for your life and that of your fellow Marines.” - Leatherneck Magazine of the Marines

“The author of this gripping account of Vietnam infantry combat set out to redeem the reputation of the American fighting man in a very controversial conflict… Glass finally gives credit where it is most due, to the grunts who, like their fellows in other wars, bore the lion’s share of the burden in Vietnam.”  -Booklist

“In a plain, straightforward style unembellished with jingoism or theatrics, Glass intricately weaves all the horrific action of that week I spent one night with Charlie Co. into a fine and inspiring chronicle to record many individual acts of now-sung heroism… As I critically read Lions of Medina, I found myself actually gasping for breath, for I kept holding mine as the action unfolded before me all over again, nearly forty years later…. Fortunately, Charlie Co. and I never have to redo Operation Medina. Doyle Glass has done it for us in his unmitigated, indelible style.”  -Bruce Martin, Operation Medina veteran

Awards
In 2007, Lions of Medina was voted Best Book in the Military History Category and Finalist in the World History Category by USA BookNews and a Finalist by Foreword Magazine.

References

Paperback

Hardcover

 NAL Caliber Penguin
 Nathaniel Fick
 Glass, Doyle (2007). Lions of Medina – The Marines of Charlie Company and Their Brotherhood of Valor. NAL Caliber Penguin.

External links
 Doyle Glass Website

2007 non-fiction books
Non-fiction books about the United States Marine Corps